The Arditi–Ginzburg equations describes ratio dependent predator–prey dynamics. Where N is the population of a prey species and P that of a predator, the population dynamics are described by the following two equations:

Here f(N) captures any change in the prey population not due to predator activity including inherent birth and death rates. The per capita effect of predators on the prey population (the harvest rate) is modeled by a function g which is a function of the ratio N/P of prey to predators. Predators receive a reproductive payoff, e, for consuming prey, and die at rate u. Making predation pressure a function of the ratio of prey to predators contrasts with the prey dependent Lotka–Volterra equations, where the effect of predators on the prey population is simply a function of the magnitude of the prey population g(N). Because the number of prey harvested by each predator decreases as predators become more dense, ratio dependent predation represents an example of a trophic function. Ratio dependent predation may account for heterogeneity  in large-scale natural systems in which predator efficiency decreases when prey is scarce. The merit of ratio dependent versus prey dependent models of predation has been the subject of much controversy, especially between the biologists Lev R. Ginzburg and Peter A. Abrams. Ginzburg purports that ratio dependent models more accurately depict predator-prey interactions while Abrams maintains that these models make unwarranted complicating assumptions. Recent editions of the leading ecology undergraduate textbook devotes about equal space to Lotka-Volterra and Arditi-Ginzburg equations.

See also
 Lotka–Volterra equation
 Population dynamics

References

Predation
Ordinary differential equations
Population models
Mathematical modeling
Community ecology